Nallavan is a 1955 Indian Tamil-language film directed by M. Thiruvengadam. The film stars R. S. Manohar, Serukalathur Sama, P. K. Saraswathi and Rajasulochana.

Cast
List adapted from the database of Film News Anandan.

Male cast
R. S. Manohar
Serukalathur Sama
M. N. Nambiar
Mustafa
V. K. Ramasamy

Female cast
P. K. Saraswathi
Rajasulochana
S. Revathi
C. K. Saraswathi

Production
Nallavan was produced by Sunrise Productions and directed by M. Thiruvengadam. O. K. Durai and S. Raghavan wrote the story while S. L. Narayanan penned the dialogues. G. Chandran and S. Surya were in charge of cinematography and editing respectively. S. K. Jayavar and Nayak handled the art direction. Choreography was by T. G. Thangaraj and K. K. Sinha. Still photography was done by S. N. Ragasamy and Tukaram. Shooting took place at the now defunct Film Centre and Star Combines studios.

Soundtrack 
The soundtrack of the film was composed by M. S. Gnanamani, while the lyrics were written by Thanjai N. Ramaiah Dass. Ghantasala, V. N. Sundaram, Thiruchi Loganathan, P. Leela, N. L. Ganasaraswathi and G. Kasthoori were playback singers. The soundtrack did not attain popularity.

Reception 
Nallavan was released on 5 March 1955. The film was not a commercial success, but film historian Randor Guy praised it for the "formidable cast" and "unusual storyline".

References

1955 films
1950s Tamil-language films
Indian drama films
Indian black-and-white films
1955 drama films
Films scored by M. S. Gnanamani